Niemegk is a town in the Potsdam-Mittelmark district, in Brandenburg, Germany. It is the administrative seat of the Amt ("collective municipality") Niemegk.

Geography
The municipal area is situated on the northeastern slopes of the Fläming Heath, east of the Plane river. The surrounding region comprises farmland and extended forests adjoining the High Fläming Nature Park.

The town has access to the Bundesautobahn 9 highway at the Niemegk junction.

History
A Burgward at the former site of a Slavic fortress (gord) was first mentioned in an 1161 deed, at the time when the Ascanian margrave Albert the Bear conquered the Hevelli lands in the north. The name Nymik or Niemeke is possibly derived from the town of Nijmegen in the Low Countries, the place of origin of German settlers. The estates were held by the Teutonic Order and the former village was vested with town privileges in 1228.

Since the mid 13th century, the area was part of the Ascanian Duchy of Saxe-Wittenberg and, from 1356, of the Saxon electorate. Located on its northeastern border, it was the scene of numerous conflicts with Brandenburg knights and the forces of the Magdeburg archbishops. The town again suffered from Hussite raids in 1429, marauding Imperial troops after the Saxon defeat at the 1547 Battle of Mühlberg, and was devastated in the Thirty Years' War.

After the Napoleonic Wars and the 1815 Congress of Vienna, the town fell to Prussia and was incorporated into the Province of Brandenburg. From 1868, young Robert Koch worked in Niemegk as a country doctor.

Demography

Politics

Seats in the town's assembly (Stadtverordnetenversammlung) as of 2014 local elections:
Zukunft Niemegk (independent): 3
Social Democratic Party of Germany (SPD): 3
Christian Democratic Union of Germany (CDU): 2
Free Democratic Party (FDP): 1
Free Voters: 1
The Left: 1
Individual candidate: 1

Notable people
Dieter Appelt (born 1935), photographer

References

External links

Municipal website 

Localities in Potsdam-Mittelmark
Fläming Heath